The Pilbara bandy bandy (Vermicella snelli) is a species of venomous snake in the family Elapidae. The species is endemic to Australia.

Etymology
The specific name, snelli, is in honor of Charles Snell who donated the holotype to the Western Australian Museum.

Geographic range
V. snelli is found in the northern part of the Australian state of Western Australia.

Habitat
The preferred natural habitats of V. snelli are grassland and shrubland.

Reproduction
V. snelli is oviparous.

References

Further reading
Cogger HG (2000). Reptiles and Amphibians of Australia, Sixth Edition. Sydney, Australia: New Holland Publishers. 808 pp. . (Vermicella snelli, new status, p. 696).
Cogger HG (2014). Reptiles and Amphibians of Australia, Seventh Edition. Clayton, Victoria, Australia: CSIRO Publishing. xxx + 1,033 pp. .
Keogh JS, Smith SA (1996). "Taxonomy and natural history of the Australian bandy-bandy snakes (Elapidae: Vermicella) with a description of two new species". Journal of Zoology 240: 677–701.
Storr GM (1968). "The genus Vermicella (Serpentes: Elapidae) in Western Australia and the Northern Territory". Journal of the Royal Society of Western Australia 50: 80–92. (Vermicella annulata snelli, new subspecies, p. 82).
Wilson S, Swan G (2013). A Complete Guide to Reptiles of Australia, Fourth Edition. Sydney, Australia: New Holland Publishers. 522 pp. .

Reptiles described in 1968
Snakes of Australia
Taxa named by Glen Milton Storr
Vermicella